Crossings is a gospel album by American guitarist Tony Rice, released in 1994.

Track listing 
 "In the Sweet By and By" (Traditional, Joseph P. Webster)
 "I Have Decided to Follow Jesus"
 "Swing Low, Sweet Chariot" (Traditional)
 "Holy, Holy, Holy"
 "Living by Faith"
 "Amazing Grace" (John Newton)
 "Victory in Jesus"
 "Sweet Hour of Prayer" (Traditional)
 "I Feel Like Traveling On"
 "Just as I Am" (Charlotte Elliott)
 "Are You Washed in the Blood?" (Traditional)
 "Doxology"

Personnel 
 Tony Rice – guitar, vocals
 David Johnson – banjo, fiddle, guitar, harmonica, mandolin, viola, banjolin, dobro
 Tim Surrett – Bass
 Ben Isaacs- Bass
 Tony Creasman – drums, percussion
Production notes:
 David Johnson – producer, arranger
 Tim Surrett – producer
 Mickey Gamble – executive producer
 Tony Rice – mixing
 Eddie Swan – engineer, mixing
 Kevin Ward – assistant engineer
 Laura Carroll – cover design
 Jeff Collins – cover design
 John Miller – photography

References 

1994 albums
Tony Rice albums